Whitley-Kosciusko Consolidated High School, also known as Whitko Jr./Sr. High School, is a public high school located in South Whitley, Indiana.

Athletics
Whitko Jr./Sr. High School's athletic teams are the Wildcats and they compete in the Three Rivers Conference. The school offers a wide range of athletics including:
Football
Wrestling
Basketball
Cross Country
Track and Field
Baseball
Softball
Golf
Soccer
Volleyball
Archery

See also
 List of high schools in Indiana

References

External links
 Official Website

Public high schools in Indiana
Schools in Whitley County, Indiana
1971 establishments in Indiana